Governor McDonald or MacDonald may refer to:

Charles James McDonald (1793–1860), Governor of Georgia
Jesse Fuller McDonald (1858–1942), Governor of Colorado
Malcolm MacDonald (1901–1981), Governor of Kenya in 1963 and Governor-General of Kenya from 1963 to 1964
William C. McDonald (governor) (1858–1918), Governor of New Mexico

See also
Bob McDonnell (born 1954), Governor of Virginia
Richard Graves MacDonnell (1814–1881), Governor of The Gambia from 1847 to 1851, of South Australia from 1855 to 1862, of Nova Scotia from 1864 to 1865, and of Hong Kong from 1866 to 1872